Operation Tiger 94 ( or ) was a military action in the summer of 1994, by the Army of the Republic of Bosnia and Herzegovina (ARBiH) against the Bosnian autonomous zone of the Autonomous Province of Western Bosnia, its leader Fikret Abdić and his Serbian backers the Army of the Republic of Serb Krajina (SVK), and the Army of Republika Srpska (VRS). The battle was a huge success for the ARBiH, which was able to rout Abdić's forces and occupy the territory of Western Bosnia. Fikret Abdić was able to recapture the territory in November 1994 in Operation Spider.

Background 
The early 1990s saw the existence of a western "Muslim" enclave held by Bosnian government forces under the leadership of the  ARBiH commander, Atif Dudaković. The region was fortunate that even having some Croatian population in southwest, it was able to avoid internecine fighting between the once-allied Croatian Defence Council (HVO) forces and government Bosnian ARBiH forces that plagued central Bosnia.  This was however about the only thing the western enclave had in its favour.

In addition to being completely surrounded by Serbian forces with the Republic of Serbian Krajina to the west and the Bosnian Republika Srpska (VRS) to the east, the Western enclave forces had to deal with the Autonomous Province of Western Bosnia and its leader Fikret Abdić.

AP Western Bosnia

The Autonomous Province of Western Bosnia was a de facto independent entity that existed in the Western enclave of present-day Bosnia and Herzegovina between 1993 and 1995. Its capital city was Velika Kladuša. In 1993 Fikret Abdić, once the president of the Agrokomerc company, decided to carve out a little state for himself and succeeded in recruiting enough followers to make his dream a reality. Abdić was able to hold power over his mini-state by using cult-like propaganda techniques over his followers and Serbian arms and military training. Local residents of Velika Kladusa were reported as treating Abdić with excessive reference and "were ready to do whatever he said."

5th Corps
Even though it was totally surrounded by Serbian forces and constantly harassed by Abdić's followers, the western enclave protected by the 5th Corps of the Army of the Republic of Bosnia and Herzegovina (five infantry brigades strong) was able to hold its own and achieve some success partly thanks to the leadership of Atif Dudaković. By the summer of 1994, Dudaković had developed a plan in hopes of eliminating the Autonomous Province of Western Bosnia.

Secret plan
The plan was hatched by Dudaković and the commander of the 5th Corps 502nd Brigade, Hamdija Abdić known as "Tigar" (no relation to Fikret Abdić). In total secrecy, Hamdija approached Fikret Abdić as a dissatisfied military commander willing to sell his services and treachery to him for the right price. Fikret Abdić was suspicious but decided to take the risk and gave Hamdija a large sum of money, promising that if fighting broke out he would support Hamdija's coup attempt. Hamdija promptly informed Dudaković, who ordered that all aid workers be confined to quarters and that large fires be started using piles of tires to create the illusion of burning buildings. Then Dudaković told his dumbfounded troops to fire in the air as if they were fighting an invisible enemy.

Fikret Abdić and his Serbian backers, watching from a distance, saw the smoke and heard the gunfire while listening to rattled aid workers yelling over their radio channels for extraction.  Assuming they were seeing a military coup in progress, they promptly sent in their best weapons, troops and officers to support Hamdija Abdić. Abdić had been lured into a trap, and Dudaković and the still-loyal 5th Corps were able to force the swift surrender of his forces and seize badly needed weapons.  The Serbian VRS and SVK turned out Fikret Abdić in a rage, and what was left of his demoralized forces had to face an attack by Dudaković's strengthened 5th Corps. They were quickly routed.

The testimony of Colonel Patrick Barriot
Q.Tell me, in Krajina, at the time of the conflict between the Muslim forces in the Bihać pocket, according to the information I have, is it correct that there were 40.000 Muslim refugees in Krajina?
A. Yes. I can confirm the figures. This happened during the summer of 1994. The 5th Corps of the BH army in the Bihać pocket was headed by General Atif Dudaković and it launched an attack especially in the area of Velika Kladuša, and it expelled up to 40.000 Muslims who were faithful to Fikret Abdić. These 40.000 Muslims were expelled towards the Krajina area, and they were taken in two camps which I personally visited together with people, officials from the UNHCR. Bertrand Dupasquier was a responsible official at the time. These 40.000 people were taken in the Batnoga and Turan camps where they were taken care of with a lot of humanity by the local population in Krajina. The local population fed them but also looked after them medically speaking; if they were wounded, if they were sick, if they were women about to deliver, they were taken care of. So all these Muslims were gathered in Batnoga and Turan and they were taken care of in the Glina Hospital with total dedication. They were given blood supplies. They were helped without any kind of discrimination. And very often the few medicines, the few supplies that there were in the Glina Hospital were given to the Muslim population.
Q. These refugees, these 40.000 Muslims who came to Krajina, could they have gone to Croatia or somewhere else?
A. No. It was impossible for them to get out and to seek shelter in Krajina or elsewhere. The only opening for them or the only possibility offered to them later on was a return to the Bihac pocket early in 1995. And it is precisely in the Bihać pocket that the large amount of them were massacred during the Operation Storm by the 5th Corps of the BH army, but also by Croat troops that had infiltrated in Bosnia-Herzegovina and in Western Bosnia.
Q. Does that mean that there was a double standard involved in terms of treating the Muslim population itself; those who were on Alija Izetbegović's side received support whereas those who were on Fikret Abdić's side were exposed to all kinds of persecution, destruction and the like?
A. I'm sorry, I didn't quite understand your question.
Q. Does that mean that the Muslims who were on the side of Fikret Abdić, including these 40.000 expelled refugees, were practically victims of persecution by the Muslim and Croat forces?
A. Yes, quite. Absolutely. In 1994, it was obvious that the central authority in Sarajevo and that Izetbegović's army was trying everything possible to eliminate both Fikret Abdić and to remove all the Muslims in the Bihać pocket faithful to the latter. So they were exposed, and they were victims of the central authority in Sarajevo, and they also fell prey to the Croat forces which were intent on removing any kind of support to the Krajina Serbs, support by the Muslims who were in the Bihać pocket.
Q. What about the authorities of the Republic of the Serbian Krajina? Was it clear to them that since these Muslims had nowhere to go that a considerable number of these people could stay on in Krajina forever?
A. Yes. In my view there was no problem whatsoever regarding taking in the Muslims in the Krajina Republic, because even before the 5th Corps was created in the Bihać pocket, it was obvious and it was frequent that Muslims would come from Velika Kladuša, from that area towards Glina where they were taken care of, they were looked after, and they could remain very safely in that area and also in Banovina.

Aftermath
Fikret Abdić was able to recapture the territory in November 1994 in Operation Spider. It was renamed to "Republic of Western Bosnia" in 1995.

As a consequence of the 1995 Operation Storm, the Republic of Western Bosnia was dissolved, its forces defeated and its territory was incorporated into the Federation of Bosnia and Herzegovina (present day Una-Sana Canton).

Fikret Abdić was arrested and after the war he was convicted for acts of war crimes against civilian Bosniaks that stayed loyal to the Republic of Bosnia and Herzegovina. The government of Bosnia-Herzegovina charged him with the deaths of 121 civilians and three prisoners of war, and the wounding of 400 civilians in the Bihać region. Croatia, where he had taken refuge, refused to extradite him, but he was put on trial there. In 2002 he was sentenced to 20 years in prison for war crimes committed in the area of the "Bihać pocket". In 2005 the Croatian Supreme Court reduced the sentence to 15 years.

Other major counterattacks by both Croatian and Bosnian forces in western Bosnia included Croatian Operation Mistral 2 (September 1995) and Bosnian Operation Sana (October 1995). Further offensives were ended by the signing of the Dayton Agreement, largely thanks to pressure from those operations and the NATO bombardment of Bosnian Serbs.

The Serbian population of those areas of Croatia and Bosnia and Herzegovina fled east, to Banja Luka and as far as Vojvodina and Kosovo. The United Nations estimated there were 150,000-200,000 refugees from Croatia alone. The number of refugees from western Bosnia is unknown.

References

Bosnian War
Conflicts in 1994
Military operations of the Bosnian War
1994 in Bosnia and Herzegovina
June 1994 events in Europe
July 1994 events in Europe
August 1994 events in Europe